The 2014 Illinois State Redbirds football team represented Illinois State University as a member of the Missouri Valley Football Conference (MVFC) during the 2014 NCAA Division I FCS football season. Led by sixth-year head coach Brock Spack, the Redbirds compiled an overall record of 13–2 with a mark of 7–1 in conference play, sharing the MVFC title with North Dakota State. Illinois State received an at-large bid to the NCAA Division I Football Championship playoffs. After a first-round bye, the Redbirds defeated Northern Iowa in the second round, Eastern Washington in the quarterfinals, and New Hampshire in the semifinals before losing to North Dakota State in the NCAA Division I Championship Game. The team played home games at Hancock Stadium in Normal, Illinois.

Schedule

Ranking movements

Redbirds drafted

References

Illinois State
Illinois State Redbirds football seasons
Missouri Valley Football Conference champion seasons
Illinois State
Illinois State Redbirds football